Velika Planina Ski Resort is a Slovenian ski resort located in Kamnik-Savinja Alps mountain in municipality of Kamnik. Velika Planina is a family ski resort, which has 6 km of ski slopes.

Resort statistics
Elevation
Summit - 1666 m / (5,464)
Base - 1412 m / (4,364 ft)

Ski Terrain
0,4 km2 (100 acres) - covering  of ski slopes on one mountain.

Slope Difficulty
expert (1 km)
intermediate (4 km)
beginner (1 km)

Vertical Drop
- 254 m - (833 ft) in total

Longest Run: "Šimnovec" 

Average Winter Daytime Temperature: 

Average Annual Snowfall: 

Lift Capacity: 5,300 skiers per hour (all together)

Ski Season Opens: December

Ski Season Ends: April 

Snow Conditions Phone Line: 386 (0)1 8327258

Other activities
mountain biking, hiking

Ski lifts

External links
 velikaplanina.si/skiing - official site

Ski areas and resorts in Slovenia